Hippie Masala: Für immer in Indien (titled Hippie Masala: Forever in India in English) is a 2006 Swiss documentary film directed by filmmaker Ulrich Grossenbacher and anthropologist Damaris Lüthi.

In 2007, the film was one of five nominated for "Best Documentary" in the Swiss Film Prize, though the prize was taken by Das kurze Leben des José Antonio Gutierrez.

The film focuses on the aftermath of the hippie migration to Asia, specifically documenting the lives of six hippies who chose to remain in India: Cesare from Italy, Erica and Gillian from South Africa, Hanspeter from Switzerland, Meera from Belgium and Robert from the Netherlands. No longer in their 20s, they are leading the lives of a traditional yogi and a female meditator in retreat, a painter with a local wife and children, designers of beach clothing in Goa, and a farmer who hunts and cares for his cows in the Himalayas.

Festivals
International Film Festival of India 2008
Miami International Film Festival 2007
Woodstock Film Festival 2007
Munich International Documentary Film Festival 2006
DOCNZ International Documentary Film Festival 2006

References

External links
 

Swiss documentary films
Documentary films about India
2006 films
Hippie films
Expatriates in India
Films shot in India
Documentary films about spirituality
Documentary films about drugs
2000s German-language films
2000s Hindi-language films
2000s Kannada-language films
2006 documentary films
2000s English-language films